Cycles is the seventh album by Native American/Mexican American band Redbone released on the RCA label in 1977.

Track listing

Side one
"Cycles" (P. Vegas/L. Vegas) – 4:48
"Open (Give It Back to Me)" (P. Vegas/L. Vegas/E. Summers) – 3:20
"Gamble (Take a Chance on Me)" (P. Vegas/L. Vegas) – 3:30
"Ooh" (L. Vegas) – 5:05
"Give Our Love Another Try" (P. Vegas/L. Vegas) - 4:56

Side two
"Dancing Bones" (P. Vegas/L. Vegas) – 5:05
"Checkin' It Out" (L. Vegas) – 4:59
"Funky Silk" (P. Vegas) – 4:10
"Don't Say No" (P. Vegas/L. Vegas) - 4:26

Personnel
 Lolly Vegas – guitars, vocals
 Pat Vegas – bass, percussion, vocals
 Aloisio Aguiar – acoustic piano, Fender Rhodes, clavinet, string ensemble, percussion

Additional personnel
 Linda Creed - background vocals
 Jerry Goldstein - background vocals

References

1977 albums
Redbone (band) albums
RCA Records albums